General Schneider may refer to:

Antoine Virgile Schneider (1779–1847), French Army lieutenant general
Erich Schneider (1894–1980), German Wehrmacht lieutenant general
Kevin Schneider (fl. 1980s–2020s), U.S. Air Force lieutenant general
Merlin F. Schneider (1901–1970), U.S. Marine Corps brigadier general
René Schneider (1913–1970), Chilean Army general
William H. Schneider (1934–1994), U.S. Army lieutenant general

See also
Attorney General Schneider (disambiguation)
General Snyder (disambiguation)